The St John's Group is a fossiliferous shale-dominated Ediacaran geologic group in Newfoundland and Labrador, younger than .

It corresponds to the upper portion of the Connecting Point Group

See also

 List of fossiliferous stratigraphic units in Newfoundland and Labrador

References

 

Ediacaran Newfoundland and Labrador